Mambo! is the fifth studio album by Peruvian soprano Yma Sumac. It was released in 1954 by Capitol Records. Most of the tracks were composed by her husband Moisés Vivanco.

Track listing 

The original 10" edition had eight tracks. "Goomba Boomba", "Cha Cha Gitano" and "Carnavalito Boliviano" were added for the 1955 LP edition.

References

External links 
SunVirgin.com
Yma-Sumac.com

1954 albums
Yma Sumac albums
Capitol Records albums